Paliga quadrigalis is a moth in the family Crambidae. It is found on Sumatra and in Australia.

References

Moths described in 1901
Pyraustinae